The Roman Catholic Diocese of Fajardo–Humacao() is an ecclesiastical territory or diocese of the Roman Catholic Church and consists of part of the east and the northeast of the island of Puerto Rico. The current bishop is Luis Miranda Rivera, who was appointed on May 16, 2020 by Pope Francis. The mother church is Cathedral Santiago Apóstol in Fajardo, Puerto Rico.

The See of Fajardo–Humacao was canonically erected on May 11, 2008, and is a suffragan diocese of the Metropolitan Province of San Juan de Puerto Rico. Its jurisdiction includes the municipalities of Loíza, Canóvanas, Río Grande, Luquillo, Fajardo, Ceiba, Naguabo, Humacao, Culebra, and Vieques.

Ordinaries
The list of the Bishops of Fajardo–Humacao (Latin rite) and their tenures of service:
 Eusebio Ramos Morales (March 11, 2008 – February 2, 2017), appointed Bishop of Caguas
 Luis Miranda Rivera, O. Carm. (Appointed on May 16, 2020; Consecrated and installed on August 15, 2020)

San Juan Archdiocese bankruptcy
On 7 September 2018, Judge Edward Godoy ruled that the bankruptcy filed by the Archdiocese of San Juan would also apply to every Catholic diocese in Puerto Rico, including Fajardo-Humacao, and that all would now have their assets protected under Chapter 11.

Gallery

See also

 Catholic Church by country
 Catholic Church in the United States
 Global organisation of the Catholic Church
 Ecclesiastical Province of San Juan de Puerto Rico
 List of Roman Catholic archdioceses (by country and continent)
 List of Roman Catholic dioceses (alphabetical) (including archdioceses)
 List of Roman Catholic dioceses (structured view) (including archdioceses)
 List of the Catholic dioceses of the United States

References

External links
 Official Facebook page (in Spanish)
 Roman Catholic Diocese of Fajardo-Humacao GCatholic.org website

2008 establishments in Puerto Rico
Roman Catholic Diocese of Fajardo-Humacao
Roman Catholic dioceses in Puerto Rico
Roman Catholic dioceses and prelatures established in the 21st century
Roman Catholic dioceses in the United States
Roman Catholic bishops of Fajardo–Humacao